Glenwyvis distillery is a Scotch whisky and gin distillery located in Dingwall, Scotland.

The distillery is owned by a group of crowdfunders and is entirely powered by renewable energies like hydro, wind, solar, and chip biomass heating systems. Its name comes from the idea of carrying on old traditions of the past and contemplates two previous distilleries of the area, the Ben Wyvis in Dingwall and the Glenskiach in Evanton. The distillery is not open to the public and does not have a visitor centre at present.

History
The Glenwyvis distillery was founded in 2015 by John Mckenzie, a farmer, green energy advocate and a commercial helicopter pilot.

In 2016 a crowdsourced fundraising campaign was launched and in just seventy-seven days more than two thousands persons, of which more than half coming from the same geographical area, offered around £2.6 million.

After a second share offer Glenwyvis the company has over three thousand shareholders.

The distillery itself was built in 2017 on an uphill terrain few miles from the town of Dingwall. (a return of distilling to Dingwall, which has been without a distillery since 1926), with the opening happening on the 30th November 2017 (St. Andrew's Day, the Scottish National Day).

In 2018 Glenwyvis distillery started both whisky and gin production with the lead of master distiller Duncan Tait.
After one year, more than five hundred casks were resting onsite.
In 2018–19, Glenwyvis reached 39248 liters of whisky and 3576 liters of Premium GoodWill gin.

In 2018 GlenWyvis Distillery and the company Geotourist created an app to promote a walking tour experience in Dingwall.

In October 2019 a fire broke out at the woodchip store, reporting limited damage in the wood chip storage, any spread occurred to the boiler or anywhere else.

During the COVID-19 pandemic in Scotland, the distillery held a live online cookery demo from Master Chef Gary Maclean who agreed on creating some delicatessen making use of Goodwill Gin.

Currently, by October 2022, Glenwyvis distillery offers four types of gin, one type of spirit and a three years old whisky.

Awards
 2019 Scottish Gin Awards: Best Newcomer
 World Gin Awards 2019: Bronze Medal
 IWSC Bronze 2019: GlenWyvis GoodWill Gin
 IWSC Gold 2019: GlenWyvis Christmas GoodWill Spiced Gin
 2019 Scottish Rural Awards: Artisan Drink
 World Gin Awards 2020: Gold Medal
 IWSC Silver 2020: Cask Matured Goodwill Quercus Alba Gin
 IWSC Silver 2020: Glenwyvis New Make Spirit

See also
 List of whisky brands
 List of gin brands
 List of distilleries in Scotland

References

External links

Distilleries in Scotland
Whisky distillers
Gins
Dingwall